The palm rat (Rattus palmarum) is a species of rodent in the family Muridae. It is found in the Nicobar Islands, on Car Nicobar and  Great Nicobar islands.

The palm rat's natural habitats are subtropical or tropical dry forest and subtropical or tropical mangrove forest.

References

Rattus
Rats of Asia
Endemic fauna of the Nicobar Islands
Rodents of India
Mammals described in 1869
Taxonomy articles created by Polbot